The 2021–22 South Dakota State Jackrabbits women's basketball represented South Dakota State University in the 2021–22 NCAA Division I women's basketball season. The Jackrabbits, led by twenty-second year head coach Aaron Johnston, compete in the Summit League. They played their home games in Frost Arena in Brookings, South Dakota.

Previous season
The Jackrabbits went 21–4 overall and 14–0 in conference play, finishing first in the Summit League.

South Dakota State lost in the quarterfinals in an upset to #8 seed Omaha, but still qualified for the 2021 NCAA Division I women's basketball tournament as an at-large bid.

In the 2021 NCAA Tournament, the Jacks received a nine seed in the River Walk Regional and played the Syracuse Orange. They would end up losing to the Orange 55–72.

Departures

Additions

Roster

Schedule

|-
!colspan=9 style=| Exhibition

|-
!colspan=9 style=| Non-conference regular season

|-
!colspan=9 style=| Summit League regular season

|-
!colspan=9 style=| Summit League Women's Tournament (2–1)

|-
!colspan=9 style=| National Invitational Tournament (5–0)

Source:

Rankings
2021–22 NCAA Division I women's basketball rankings

Honors

Summit League Player of the Week
 December 27, 2021 – Paige Meyer
 February 14, 2022 – Myah Selland

Postseason awards

Summit League Coach of the Year
Aaron Johnston

All-Summit League Team
Myah Selland, First team
Paige Meyer, Second team
Paiton Burckhard, Honorable Mention 
Tylee Irwin, Honorable Mention 
Tori Nelson, Honorable Mention 
Summit League All-Defensive Team
Tylee Irwin
Summit League All-Newcomer Team
Paige Meyer

WNIT Most Valuable Player
Myah Selland
WNIT All-Tournament Team
Myah Selland
Haleigh Timmer

References

South Dakota State Jackrabbits women's basketball seasons
Women's National Invitation Tournament championship seasons
Jack
South Dakota State
Jack
South Dakota State